James Dana may refer to:

 James Dana (clergyman) (1735–1812), United States clergyman
 James Dwight Dana (1813–1895), American geologist, mineralogist and zoologist
 James Dana (mayor) (1811–1890), mayor of Charlestown, Massachusetts
 James Freeman Dana (1793–1827), United States chemist